Dibaphimitra florida is a species of sea snail, a marine gastropod mollusk in the family Mitridae, the miters or miter snails.

References

 Petuch E.J. (1987). New Caribbean molluscan faunas. Charlottesville, Virginia: The Coastal Education and Research Foundation. 154 pp., 29 pls; addendum 2 pp., 1 pl.

External links
 Gould, A. A. (1856). Descriptions of new species of shells. Proceedings of the Boston Society of Natural History. 6: 11-16
  Rosenberg, G.; Moretzsohn, F.; García, E. F. (2009). Gastropoda (Mollusca) of the Gulf of Mexico, Pp. 579–699 in: Felder, D.L. and D.K. Camp (eds.), Gulf of Mexico–Origins, Waters, and Biota. Texas A&M Press, College Station, Texas
 Fedosov A., Puillandre N., Herrmann M., Kantor Yu., Oliverio M., Dgebuadze P., Modica M.V. & Bouchet P. (2018). The collapse of Mitra: molecular systematics and morphology of the Mitridae (Gastropoda: Neogastropoda). Zoological Journal of the Linnean Society. 183(2): 253-337

Mitridae
Gastropods described in 1856